Mi Propósito is an album from Puerto Rican Christian singer Julissa. It was released in 2005.

Track listing

 "Te Alabo Señor" - 04:15
 "Cada Dia" - 03:35
 "Coronado De Gloria" - 03:59
 "Glorificado" - 04:00
 "Llenas Mi ser" - 04:16
 "Estar En Tú Presencia" - 04:56
 "Contigo Quiero Estar" - 03:29
 "Mi Vida Tuya Es" - 03:05
 "El Cielo Es Mi Hogar" - 03:56
 "Enamorada" - 04:25

Awards

The album was nominated for a Dove Award for Spanish Language Album of the Year at the 37th GMA Dove Awards.

Notes

External links
 El Ritmo de la Vida on Amazon.com

2005 albums
Julissa (singer) albums